Slavko Kalezić (born 4 October 1985) is a Montenegrin actor, singer and songwriter. He took part in X Factor Adria but failed to make it to the live shows. He represented Montenegro in the Eurovision Song Contest 2017 with the song "Space". In 2017, he took part in the fourteenth series of The X Factor UK, where he was eliminated from the competition at judges' houses.

Beginnings
Kalezić studied at the Academy of Performing Arts at Cetinje, Montenegro and later on becoming part of Ensemble of the Montenegrin National Theatre. He played various roles in theater and movies, performed at various music events but also at European Pride shows in Tel Aviv, Stockholm, London, and Madrid. He was invited to return to Madrid for World Pride in the summer of 2017, where he performed in the gala finale held at Puerta de Alcalá alongside other Eurovision Song Contest alumni such as Loreen, Conchita, Barei, Rosa Lopez, Ruth Lorenzo, Suzy and Kate Ryan. In the promotional season for the 2018 Eurovision Song Contest, Slavko was invited to perform at both the Australian preview parties in Sydney and Melbourne, making him the first artist from the contest to attend these events.

In 2011, Kalezić released the single "Muza".

Career

In X Factor Adria
In 2013, Kalezić became more prominent by competing in series 1 of X Factor Adria, the Serbian pan-regional version of The X Factor. During the Podgorica, Montenegro auditions, he sang Beyoncé's "End of Time", successfully advancing to the bootcamp for the "Over 27" category, mentored by Željko Joksimović. He sang "Get Lucky" and "Cosmic Girl", and was then promoted to the Judges' house stage, where he performed "Ljuljaj me nezno", being mentored by Joksimović, who was assisted by Tony Cetinski, but he failed to make it to the live shows and the Final 14.

After X Factor Adria
In 2014, subsequent to X Factor Adria, Kalezić released the album San o vječnosti. Singles included most notably "Krivac", "Feel the Music" and "Freedom".

Eurovision 2017

Kalezić was confirmed to be internally selected as the Montenegrin entrant to the Eurovision Song Contest 2017 with his song, "Space", on 29 December 2016.  He represented Montenegro in the Eurovision Song Contest 2017 with the song "Space". It was written by Adis Eminić, Iva Boršić, Momčilo Zeković and produced by Stefan Orn and Jovan Radomir in studios in Stockholm . Montenegro was drawn to compete in the first semi-final of the Eurovision Song Contest which took place on 9 May 2017. Performing during the show in position 6, "Space" was placed 16th in the first semi-final with a total of 56 points and therefore was not in the top 10 entries of the first semi-final, so did not qualify to compete in the final.

In UK The X Factor
In July 2017, he auditioned for the fourteenth series of the UK The X Factor. During his audition he revealed that judge Louis Walsh, who was also at the Contest in Kyiv as a member of the Irish delegation, advised him to audition. He received a "Yes" from three of the four judges and progressed to Bootcamp. He survived Bootcamp and progressed to Nicole Scherzinger's Judges' House. At Judges' Houses he was not selected by his mentor Nicole Scherzinger to go through to live shows and therefore was eliminated from the competition.  He was included as a potential wildcard act but did not get enough votes from the public.

Eurovision 2018

Kalezić was invited by RTP and OGAE Portugal to travel to Lisbon and perform at a number of events during the 2018 Eurovision Song Contest. Slavko performed remixes of his Eurovision 2017 song "Space" along with new single "El Ritmo" at the Eurofan Café, Wiwijam, Trumps Lisboa and Euroclub. He also attended the semi final in which Montenegro were competing as well as the Grand Final.

Moja Istina

In April 2018 Kalezić published a book called Moja Istina (meaning My Truth) documenting his experience at Eurovision 2017 and The X Factor. It was published in Montenegrin with a view to having it translated to English later on. In November 2019, he produced and performed a one-off show at the Ramada Hotel in Podgorica of the same name, telling the story of the book in a musical multi-media show.

Eurovision 2019 
Kalezić was invited by OGAE Israel to perform at the Eurofan Cafe during the week of the semi finals.  He stayed for the Grand Final to support the artists competing.

Discography

Albums

Singles

Filmography
 L'homme qui voulait vivre sa vie (2010)
 Lokalni vampir (2011)
 Budva na pjenu od mora (2012/2014) - Roman
 The Kids from the Marx and Engels Street (2014) - Fake prostitute

Awards

References

External links
 Montenegrin National Theatre Profile
 IMDB profile Profile
 Official website

Eurovision Song Contest entrants of 2017
21st-century Montenegrin male singers
Eurovision Song Contest entrants for Montenegro
Montenegrin expatriates in England
Living people
1985 births
The X Factor contestants
Musicians from Podgorica
Actors from Podgorica
Gay singers
Gay songwriters
Gay actors
Montenegrin LGBT people